Ayşin Atav (born 2 April 1948) is a Turkish film and voice actress.

Career 
Ayşin Atav was born on 2 April 1948 in Ankara. Atav began her acting career as a theater actress in Istanbul on 1965. She appeared in over 500 films as the voice actress and actress.

Filmography 
 Korkusuz Korkak - 1979
 Yadeller - 1978
 Çılgın Gangster - 1973
 Gülüzar - 1972
 Asiler Kampı - 1972
 Allahaısmarladık Katil - 1972
 Gelinlik Kızlar - 1972
 Öfke - 1972
 Damdaki Kemancı - 1972
 Sev Kardeşim - 1972
 İlk Aşk - 1972
 Utanç - 1972
 Severek Ayrılalım - 1971
 Kezban Paris'te - 1971
 Üç Öfkeli Adam - 1971
 Bütün Aşklar Tatlı Başlar - 1970
 Kezban Roma'da - 1970
 Vatan Kurtaran Aslan - 1966
 Fakir ve Mağrur - 1966

References

External links
 

1942 births
Living people
Turkish film actresses
20th-century Turkish actresses